Nick Nicholson is the name of:

 Nick Nicholson (actor), American expatriate actor in the Philippines
 Nick Nicholson (American football), American football coach
 Nick Nicholson (singer), American country musician
 Bobby Nicholson, American actor, musician, and game show producer, often credited as "Nick Nicholson"